241 may refer to:

 241 (number), the number
 241, the year CE
 241 BC, the year BCE
 +241, the country calling code for telephone numbers in Gabon
 241 Germania, a main-belt asteroid
 241, a song by Filipino band Rivermaya from the album Between the Stars and Waves
 241, a song by American band Reel Big Fish from the album Turn the Radio Off

See also
 List of highways numbered 241
 Flight 241 (disambiguation)
 Two for one (disambiguation)